Begonia holmnielseniana is a species of plant in the family Begoniaceae. It is endemic to Ecuador.  Its natural habitats are subtropical or tropical moist montane forests and subtropical or tropical high-altitude grassland.

References

holmnielseniana
Endemic flora of Ecuador
Vulnerable plants
Taxonomy articles created by Polbot